Charles Francis Morgan (6 March 1912 – 22 May 1976) was an Australian rules footballer who played with North Melbourne in the Victorian Football League (VFL).

Morgan later served in the Australian Army during World War II.

Notes

External links 

1912 births
1976 deaths
Australian rules footballers from Victoria (Australia)
North Melbourne Football Club players